Memory Man is the third studio album by Aqualung. The album was released on 13 March 2007 in the U.S. The first single from the album was "Pressure Suit". The album debuted at #88 on the Billboard 200 chart in its first week.

Track listing
 All songs written by Matt Hales except where noted.

"Cinderella" – 4:37
"Pressure Suit" (Hales, Kim Oliver) – 4:56
"Something to Believe In" (Hales, Oliver) – 3:38
"Glimmer" (Hales, Oliver) – 4:00
"Vapour Trail" (Hales, Oliver) – 5:42
"Rolls So Deep" – 4:27
"The Lake" – 4:26
"Black Hole" – 5:04
"Outside" (Hales, Oliver) – 3:56
"Garden of Love" (Ft. Paul Buchanan of The Blue Nile) – 5:55
"Broken Bones" – 3:42

Bonus tracks
Japanese release
12. "Blood on Our Hands"
13. "Human Shield"

Best Buy version
12. "Good Times Gonna Come [Live at Portland Theater of Clouds at Rose Garden]"

iTunes version
12. "Blood on Our Hands" – 4:31

Target version
12. "Brighter Than Sunshine [Live at St. James' Church Piccadilly]" – 4:36
13. "Another Little Hole [Live at St. James' Church Piccadilly]" – 5:12
14. "Just for a Moment [Live at St. James' Church Piccadilly]" – 3:51

Reception

Memory Man has received positive reviews. On the review aggregate site Metacritic, the album has a score of 70 out of 100, indicating "generally favorable reviews."

Other
The song "Garden of Love" features guest vocals by Paul Buchanan of the Scottish band The Blue Nile.

The song "Something To Believe In" was featured in CSI: Miamis season 5 finale and in a season 4 episode of The CW's One Tree Hill.
It has also been featured in The CW and ABC's Gossip Girl and Eli Stone commercials.

The song "The Lake" was used in an episode in the third season of the TV show Grey's Anatomy.

References

Aqualung (musician) albums
2007 albums